Mellea ordinaria is a species of moth of the family Thyrididae. It is found in Australia (including Queensland) and New Guinea.

Adults are brown with several wavy paler and darker bands across the wings.

References

Moths described in 1896
Thyrididae